Nebria obliqua is a species of ground beetle in the family Carabidae. It is found in North America.

Subspecies
These two subspecies belong to the species Nebria obliqua:
 Nebria obliqua chuskae Kavanaugh, 1979
 Nebria obliqua obliqua LeConte, 1867

References

Further reading

 

obliqua
Articles created by Qbugbot
Beetles described in 1867